Denis O'Connor may refer to:

Sir Denis O'Connor (British Army officer) (1907–1988), British general
Sir Denis O'Connor (police officer) (born 1949), British police officer
 Denis O'Connor (bishop) (1841–1911), Roman Catholic Archbishop of Toronto
 Denis O'Connor (sculptor) (born 1947), New Zealand ceramicist, sculptor and writer

See also 
Dennis O'Connor (disambiguation)
Denis O'Conor, Irish nobleman and politician
Denis Charles Joseph O'Conor, Irish lawyer
Denis Maurice O'Conor, Irish politician